= Bann Na Mohra =

- Town
- Location within Pakistan
- Coordinates: 33.27°N 73.22°E
- Country: Pakistan
- Province: (Islamabad Capital Territory) Islamabad C.T
- Elevation: 562 m (1,844 ft)
- Time zone: UTC+5 (PST)

Bann Na Mohra is a town in the Islamabad Capital Territory of Pakistan. It is located at 33° 27' 50N 73° 22' 10E with an altitude of 562 metres (1847 feet).
